Estadio Las Higueras was a football stadium in Talcahuano, Chile.  It was the home ground of the Club Deportivo Huachipato until the current Estadio CAP opened in 2009.  The stadium held 10,000 people, was built in 1960, and was demolished in 2008.

Defunct football venues in Chile
Sports venues in Biobío Region
Sports venues completed in 1960
Sports venues demolished in 2008
Demolished sports venues